Shek Mun is a station on the  of Hong Kong. To the west, it serves the Shek Mun Industrial Area and northeastern portion of City One, including Siu Lek Yuen Playground. A new campus of the Hong Kong Baptist University (including a primary and a secondary school) is situated just outside exit D, to the east of the station.

History 
On 21 December 2004, Shek Mun station opened to the public with other KCR Ma On Shan Rail stations.

The Ma On Shan Line was renamed Tuen Ma Line Phase 1 at the time. Shek Mun station became an intermediate station on this temporary new line. 

Hence, Shek Mun was included in the project and is now an intermediate station on the Tuen Ma line, Hong Kong's longest railway line.

Station layout

Platforms 1 and 2 share the same island platform.

Exits
A: Ever Gain Centre
B: Shek Mun Estate 
C: Technology Park 
D: HKBU CIE

References

MTR stations in the New Territories
Ma On Shan line
Tuen Ma line
Sha Tin
Former Kowloon–Canton Railway stations
Railway stations in Hong Kong opened in 2004